Sean J. Harrington (born April 24, 1944) is a lawyer who previously served as a judge serving on the Federal Court of Canada from 2003 to 2019.

References

1944 births
Living people
Anglophone Quebec people
Judges of the Federal Court of Canada
People from Montreal